"What It's Like" is a song by American musician Everlast. It was released in July 1998 as the lead single from his second studio album, Whitey Ford Sings the Blues (1998). The song is typical of the style Everlast embraced after leaving hip hop trio House of Pain, which combines rock, hip-hop and blues while incorporating characterization and empathy towards impoverished protagonists.

The song peaked at number one on the US Billboard Mainstream Rock chart for one week and on the Modern Rock Tracks chart for nine weeks. It also reached number 13 on the Billboard Hot 100, becoming the singer's only solo top-40 hit on the US chart. Outside the United States, the song reached number four in Iceland, number six in Canada, and the top 40 in Australia, Austria, Germany, New Zealand, Switzerland, and the United Kingdom.

Song structure

Structurally, the song consists of three verses, a chorus, and a bridge. The last line of the chorus varies according to the particular situation faced by the character in the preceding verse. Each character is sympathetically presented as a victim of circumstance and as being an object of derision. Each verse ends with the line God forbid you ever had to walk a mile in his/her shoes (in the third verse, "...you ever had to wake up to hear the news") and Cause then you really might know what it's like to, with the action varying depending on what the character has to do ("sing the blues," "have to choose," and "have to lose," respectively).

The characters are:
 A beggar (We’ve all seen the man at the liquor store beggin’ for your change/The hair on his face is dirty, dreadlocked and full of mange); when asking for change from a man, he is rudely rejected (He asks the man for what he could spare with shame in his eyes/"Get a job, you fuckin' slob" is all he replies)
 Mary, a pregnant girl who decides to have an abortion (Mary got pregnant from a kid named Tom who said he was in love); when she goes through the door of the clinic, she is labeled a "killer," a "sinner," and a "whore."
 A drug dealer named Max, a man with violent friends and an alcohol problem (I knew this kid named Max, he used to get fat stacks out on the corner with drugs/He liked to hang out late, he liked to get shit-faced and keep the pace with thugs) who dies a violent death (Until late one night there was a big gunfight and Max lost his head/He pulled out his chrome .45, talked some shit, and wound up dead).

The speaker attempts to build empathy for each character's struggle through the phrase "God forbid you ever had to walk a mile in his/her shoes/Cause then you really might know what it's like". The third verse changes the angle slightly to focus on the family left behind: "Now his wife and his kids are caught in the midst of all of his pain/You know it comes that way, at least that's what they say when you play the game/God forbid you ever had to wake up to hear the news/Cause then you really might know what it's like to have to lose".

Music video
The music video was directed by Frank Sacramento in Los Angeles. Everlast is shown singing underwater while the three characters depicted in his song drown. Later they are crowded around a window (possibly dead) behind which an idyllic family is enjoying dinner, oblivious to the less fortunate outside.

Track listings

UK CD and cassette single
 "What It's Like" (radio edit) – 3:49
 "What It's Like" (original album version) – 5:03

UK 7-inch single
A. "What It's Like" (original album version) – 5:03
B. "7 Years" – 4:04

European and Australian CD single
 "What It's Like" (radio edit) – 3:49
 "What It's Like" (original album version) – 5:03
 "7 Years" – 4:04

Charts

Weekly charts

Year-end charts

Release history

References

1998 singles
1998 songs
Everlast (musician) songs
Mushroom Records singles
Songs about abortion
Songs about alcohol
Songs about drugs
Songs about homelessness
Songs about poverty
Tommy Boy Records singles